Dana Olden Baldwin, M.D. (March 20, 1881– November 9, 1972) was a prominent African- American physician situated in Martinsville, Virginia. He participated in World War I as a medical officer until he was honorably discharged in 1918. He is well known for prospering an independent African-American economy by his formation of the Baldwin Business Center, St. Mary's Hospital, and Sandy Beach Resort. The institutions were meant to go over the restrictions placed upon African-Americans by Jim Crow laws, preventing entry to white establishments. Baldwin Memorial Park was formed in his honor.

Early life
Baldwin was born on March 20, 1881, in Belvoir, North Carolina, and was the oldest child of Reverend James Hayes and Mary Crutchfield Baldwin. His father was a Methodist priest. Baldwin's paternal grandfather, Jerry Baldwin, and maternal grandmother, Margaret Crutchfield, were both slaves. Baldwin worked as a farm worker from a very young age and displayed his intelligence by graduating from the Apex Normal and Industrial Institute at the age of 16 in 1897. Soon after, Baldwin moved to attend Shaw University in Raleigh, North Carolina.

The years before the war, Baldwin found it difficult to maintain his practice, but found that it grew more each year by the growing African-American population. Baldwin married a woman named Vina in 1911. They were situated on Fayette Street, the heart of Martinsville's African American American business district.  At the start of World War I, Baldwin was 36 years old and immediately he volunteered.

Military service
Upon entry into the military, Baldwin was commissioned to the Medical Reserve Corps, and, like many of his peers, he was sent for basic training at Fort Des Moines Provisional Army Officer Training School. He was given the rank of First Lieutenant. Fort Des Moines had been opened for training African-American men as there had been a huge influx of African-American volunteers and a petition was erected by the students of Howard University. However, there was still some discontent at the facility as many soldiers found that he had been unfairly assessed for merely being black.  This or discontent with his superior might have been a factor in Baldwin submitting his resignation from the 368th Ambulance Company of the 92nd Division, 317 Sanitary Train post he had been assigned.

Once he arrived in France, Baldwin had the main responsibility of handling sanitation concerns, surgery duties and hospital illnesses.  Much of the 92nd Infantry Division was involved with trench warfare and were aiding the French in pushing back the German forces, who sent a large number of gas attacks into the field.  However, Baldwin found himself mostly concerned with the breakout of influenza which came in September 1918. A large portion of the Baldwin's patients mostly consisted of illness. The war came to a close in 1919 and Baldwin was honorably discharged on April 2.

Career
Baldwin returned to Martinsville, and resumed working in his practice. It was after his military service that Baldwin really began to put an active effort in improving the conditions of the African-American Community.  In the Virginia edition of The History of the American Negro", Dr. Baldwin stated that in order for the African American community to prosper, people should start "by advocating and working for better schools, better churches... by seeing to it that children are instructed in civic duty in the schools and taught the importance and power of the ballot.

Many of the white hospitals in the area had barred entrance or denied rights for African-Americans. In 1929, Dr, Baldwin opened a 27-bed facility meant to house the poor African-American population unable to afford or enter other hospitals. It was named St. Mary's, for his mother who had encouraged him down the road to medicine. He coordinated with a younger brother who'd owned his own pharmacy.  The area was designated "Baldwin Block". Baldwin opened a number of other business in the majority of the 1920s and 1930s, including the Sandy Beach Resort, Baldwin Miniature Golf Course, Baldwin's Gymntorium and Baldwin Business Center. All these facilities were opened to the African American community as the many white institutions were barred because of the Jim Crow laws.

Dr. Baldwin was also a heavy contributor for a number of churches and societies, including AMR Church, the Masons, Old Fellows, Magic City Medical Society and The National Medical Association. Dr. Baldwin was given media attention after treating an African American man for a broken leg and forced the police department to pay his bill regarding the injury.  Baldwin continued his practice for 60 years and never retired.

Death and legacy
Dr. Baldwin died of a stroke on November 9, 1972. He was buried in Wake County, North Carolina, in the Baldwin Burial site, where a number of his family are also buried.

Dr. Baldwin was well remembered in the Martinsville community as being selfless and working with all his might to provide a brighter future for his brethren. The Virginia Foundation for the Humanities erected the Dr. Dana O. Baldwin Memorial Park situated in Baldwin Block. There are also a number of streets in the area named after him. St. Mary's stayed open until 1952 and was memorialized in an exhibit made by the Virginia Foundation for the Humanities.

Personal life
On December 24, 1911, Baldwin married Vina S. Flood, daughter of L. F. and Elizabeth Flood. Vina had been educated in Hatshorn College and was a teacher in a number of local public schools. The couple did not have children of their own. However, they adopted two girls: Mae and Rosa Baldwin. The couple also raised another three boys and one girl as foster children.

References

1972 deaths
1881 births
African Americans in World War I
20th-century African-American physicians
American military personnel of World War I
Shaw University alumni
Physicians from Virginia
United States Army Medical Corps officers
African-American United States Army personnel